Placosaris ingestalis is a moth in the family Crambidae. It was described by Snellen in 1899. It is found on Java.

References

Moths described in 1899
Pyraustinae